Niedzielski (feminine Niedzielska) is a Polish surname. Notable people with the surname include:

 Adam Niedzielski (born 1973), Polish economist and politician
 Luan José Niedzielski, Brazilian footballer
 Stanisław Niedzielski, Polish pianist

Polish-language surnames